England's Gate may mean:

 a country Pub and Restaurant in an ancient inn dating from the 17th century in Bodenham, eight miles north of Hereford, England
 Pevensey, known as 'England's gate'